The San Antonio Black Aces were a minor Negro league baseball team in the Texas Colored League from 1919–1920. The team was the winner of the 1919 Championship for the Texas Colored League.

Team members

References 

African-American history in San Antonio
African-American history of Texas
Baseball teams established in 1919
Defunct baseball teams in Texas
Negro league baseball teams